Keränen is a Finnish surname. Notable people with the surname include:

 Carrie Keranen, American voice actress and voice director
 Greg Keranen, American bass guitarist
 Iikka Keränen, Finnish video game programmer
 Janne Keränen (born 1987), Finnish ice hockey player
 Juho Keränen, Finnish ice hockey player
 Michael Keränen (born 1990), Finnish ice hockey player
 Rami Keränen, Finnish guitarist

Finnish-language surnames